Leonid Olegovich Boyev (born 19 January 1986) is a Russian former professional footballer.

Club career
He made his debut in the Russian Premier League in 2007 for FC Kuban Krasnodar.

References

1986 births
Living people
Russian footballers
FC Kuban Krasnodar players
FC Khimik-Arsenal players
FC Arsenal Tula players
Russian Premier League players
Sportspeople from Tula, Russia
Association football forwards